Vinícius da Cunha Reche (born 28 January 1984), simply known as Vinícius Reche is a Brazilian professional footballer playing for Al Taawon in Saudi Professional League as a midfielder.

Club career
A product of the Palmeiras youth academy, he played for the senior team twice between 2004 and 2007. After being released by the club, he joined Vasco da Gama where he made 5 appearances. He then had a short stint with Ituano. He then entered French football with Angers. After returning to Brazil, he joined Portuguese club Estoril Praia. Reche embraced Asian football with Saudi Arabian club Al Nassr in 2011. He won the best player of the month in December 2013.

References

External links

1984 births
Living people
Association football midfielders
Brazilian footballers
Footballers from São Paulo
Sociedade Esportiva Palmeiras players
Grêmio Barueri Futebol players
Ituano FC players
Angers SCO players
Mirassol Futebol Clube players
G.D. Estoril Praia players
Al Nassr FC players
Al-Wehda Club (Mecca) players
Al-Taawoun FC players
Campeonato Brasileiro Série A players
Campeonato Brasileiro Série B players
Ligue 2 players
Primeira Liga players
K League 1 players
Saudi Professional League players